The prime minister of Myanmar is the head of government of Myanmar. The post was re-established in 2021 by the State Administration Council, the country's ruling military junta, to lead its nominally-civilian provisional government. The provisional government is subject to the decision-making of the SAC; additionally, there is a significant overlap in the membership of both bodies. There is no provision for a prime minister in the 2008 Constitution of Myanmar, with the president being the constitutional head of government. The current prime minister is Min Aung Hlaing, who is also the leader of the junta and the commander-in-chief of defence services. The post had been used by previous military governments, as recently as 2011.

History of the office

The position of Prime Minister was created in 1948, with the adoption of the Burmese Declaration of Independence from the United Kingdom. Since then, eleven people have held the office (with two of them doing so on multiple occasions). Due to the country's long period of military rule, it has not been uncommon for the prime minister to be a serving (or recently retired) military officer.

The actual power of the prime minister has considerably varied over time, differing based on who holds the office. In 2004, a power struggle between the then–head of state, Senior General Than Shwe, chairman of the State Peace and Development Council, and his prime minister, General Khin Nyunt, resulted in the prime minister being dismissed and arrested.

The position was abolished on 30 March 2011, according to the current Constitution (adopted in 2008). It provided that the president is both the head of state and head of government. But after the 2015 general election, as Aung San Suu Kyi was constitutionally barred from becoming President, an office named State Counsellor, functionally identical to that of Prime Minister, was established for her on 6 April 2016.

On 1 August 2021, State Administration Council formed the caretaker government and chairman of SAC became Prime Minister.

List of prime ministers of Myanmar

See also
 List of colonial governors of Burma
 List of premiers of British Burma
 State Counsellor of Myanmar
 Vice President of Myanmar

Notes

References

External links
 World Statesmen – Myanmar (Burma)
 Thein Sein sworn in as Burma’s president

 
Prime Minister
Prime Minister